A list of some notable films produced in the Cinema of Italy ordered by year and decade of release For an alphabetical list of articles on Italian films see :Category:Italian films.

1910s
List of Italian films of 1910
List of Italian films of 1911
List of Italian films of 1912
List of Italian films of 1913
List of Italian films of 1914
List of Italian films of 1915
List of Italian films of 1916
List of Italian films of 1917
List of Italian films of 1918
List of Italian films of 1919

1920s
List of Italian films of 1920
List of Italian films of 1921
List of Italian films of 1922
List of Italian films of 1923
List of Italian films of 1924
List of Italian films of 1924
List of Italian films of 1926
List of Italian films of 1927
List of Italian films of 1928
List of Italian films of 1929

1930s
List of Italian films of 1930
List of Italian films of 1931
List of Italian films of 1932
List of Italian films of 1933
List of Italian films of 1934
List of Italian films of 1935
List of Italian films of 1936
List of Italian films of 1937
List of Italian films of 1938
List of Italian films of 1939

1940s
List of Italian films of 1940
List of Italian films of 1941
List of Italian films of 1942
List of Italian films of 1943
List of Italian films of 1944
List of Italian films of 1945
List of Italian films of 1946
List of Italian films of 1947
List of Italian films of 1948
List of Italian films of 1949

1950s
List of Italian films of 1950
List of Italian films of 1951
List of Italian films of 1952
List of Italian films of 1953
List of Italian films of 1954
List of Italian films of 1955
List of Italian films of 1956
List of Italian films of 1957
List of Italian films of 1958
List of Italian films of 1959

1960s
List of Italian films of 1960
List of Italian films of 1961
List of Italian films of 1962
List of Italian films of 1963
List of Italian films of 1964
List of Italian films of 1965
List of Italian films of 1966
List of Italian films of 1967
List of Italian films of 1968
List of Italian films of 1969

1970s
List of Italian films of 1970
List of Italian films of 1971
List of Italian films of 1972
List of Italian films of 1973
List of Italian films of 1974
List of Italian films of 1975
List of Italian films of 1976
List of Italian films of 1977
List of Italian films of 1978
List of Italian films of 1979

1980s
List of Italian films of 1980
List of Italian films of 1981
List of Italian films of 1982
List of Italian films of 1983
List of Italian films of 1984
List of Italian films of 1985
List of Italian films of 1986
List of Italian films of 1987
List of Italian films of 1988
List of Italian films of 1989

1990s
List of Italian films of 1990
List of Italian films of 1991
List of Italian films of 1992
List of Italian films of 1993
List of Italian films of 1994
List of Italian films of 1995
List of Italian films of 1996
List of Italian films of 1997
List of Italian films of 1998
List of Italian films of 1999

2000s
List of Italian films of 2000
List of Italian films of 2001
List of Italian films of 2002
List of Italian films of 2003
List of Italian films of 2004
List of Italian films of 2005
List of Italian films of 2006
List of Italian films of 2007
List of Italian films of 2008
List of Italian films of 2009

2010s
List of Italian films of 2010
List of Italian films of 2011
List of Italian films of 2012
List of Italian films of 2013
List of Italian films of 2014
List of Italian films of 2015
List of Italian films of 2016
List of Italian films of 2017
List of Italian films of 2018
List of Italian films of 2019

2020s 

 List of Italian films of 2020
 List of Italian films of 2021
 List of Italian films of 2022
 List of Italian films of 2023
 List of Italian films of 2024
 List of Italian films of 2025
 List of Italian films of 2026
 List of Italian films of 2027
 List of Italian films of 2028
 List of Italian films of 2029

See also
List of years in Italy
List of years in Italian television